Mont-Saint-Hilaire station is a commuter rail station operated by Exo in Mont-Saint-Hilaire, Quebec, Canada.

It is the eastern terminus of the Mont-Saint-Hilaire line.

Connecting bus routes

CIT de la Vallée du Richelieu

References

External links
 Mont-Saint-Hilaire Commuter Train Station Information (RTM)
 Mont-Saint-Hilaire Commuter Train Station Schedule (RTM)

Exo commuter rail stations
Railway stations in Montérégie
Railway stations in Canada opened in 2002
2002 establishments in Quebec
La Vallée-du-Richelieu Regional County Municipality